Amy Fee (born 1981/1982) is a Canadian politician from Ontario. She was elected to the Legislative Assembly of Ontario in the 2018 provincial election and represented the riding of Kitchener South—Hespeler as a member of the Progressive Conservative Party of Ontario from 2018 to 2022.

Fee was previously an elected trustee for Kitchener-Wilmot with the Waterloo Catholic District School Board.

She is a mother of four children, two of whom have autism. She worked with the Ontario Autism Coalition to expand access to therapies and reduce waiting lists for families.

Election results

References

External links

Progressive Conservative Party of Ontario MPPs
21st-century Canadian politicians
Living people
21st-century Canadian women politicians
Politicians from Kitchener, Ontario
Women MPPs in Ontario
Ontario school board trustees
Year of birth missing (living people)